Oxyrrhexis carbonator is a species of ichneumon wasp in the family Ichneumonidae.

Subspecies
These three subspecies belong to the species Oxyrrhexis carbonator:
 Oxyrrhexis carbonator carbonator g
 Oxyrrhexis carbonator morio (Kiss, 1929) c g
 Oxyrrhexis carbonator texana (Cresson, 1870) b
Data sources: i = ITIS, c = Catalogue of Life, g = GBIF, b = Bugguide.net

References

Further reading

External links

 

Pimplinae
Insects described in 1807